Kuryanovskaya is a rural locality (a village) in Razinskoye Rural Settlement, Kharovsky District, Vologda Oblast, Russia. The population was 14 as of 2002.

Geography 
Kuryanovskaya is located 33 km north of Kharovsk (the district's administrative centre) by road. Denisovskaya is the nearest rural locality.

References 

Rural localities in Kharovsky District